The Shwesandaw Pagoda, or Shwesandaw Paya, is a Buddhist Stupa in Twante Township, south of Yangon region, Myanmar. It is one of the popular tourist destination and also pilgrimage site for Buddhists as it is said to contain a couple of the Buddha's hairs and its name means Golden Hair Relic.

See also 
Shwesandaw Pagoda (Bagan)
Shwesandaw Pagoda (Pyay)

References

Pagodas in Myanmar